Yuxarı Zeyxur (also, Yukhari-Zeykhur and Yukhary-Zeykhur) is a village and municipality in the Qusar Rayon of Azerbaijan.  It has a population of 861.

References 

Populated places in Qusar District